Alik Arakelyan (born 21 May 1996) is an Armenian footballer who plays as a midfielder for the Armenia national team.

Career

Club
On 15 June 2021, Arakelyan left FC Pyunik when his contract expired after playing 153 games for the club.

On 22 June 2021, Arakelyan signed with Ararat Yerevan. On 10 December 2022, Ararat Yerevan announced that Arakelyan had left by mutual consent.

International
Arakelyan made his international debut for Armenia on 19 November 2018, coming on as a substitute in the 88th minute for Hovhannes Hambardzumyan in the 2018–19 UEFA Nations League D match against Liechtenstein, which finished as a 2–2 away draw.

Career statistics

International

References

External links
 
 

1996 births
Living people
Footballers from Yerevan
Armenian footballers
Armenia international footballers
Armenia youth international footballers
Armenia under-21 international footballers
Association football midfielders
FC Mika players
FC Pyunik players
Armenian Premier League players